Prince Bernhard of Lippe (Bernhard Kasimir Wilhelm Friedrich Gustav Heinrich Eduard; 26 August 1872 – 19 June 1934) was a member of the Lippe-Biesterfeld line of the House of Lippe. He was the father of Prince Bernhard of Lippe-Biesterfeld, the prince consort of Queen Juliana of the Netherlands.

Biography

Prince Bernhard of Lippe, born as Count of Lippe-Biesterfeld in Oberkassel on 26 August 1872, was the 2nd son of Ernest II, Count of Lippe-Biesterfeld, regent (1897–1904) of Principality of Lippe, and his wife Countess Karoline von Wartensleben. He was a younger brother of Leopold IV, Prince of Lippe, who succeeded as reigning Prince of Lippe in 1905. He pursued a career as a soldier, serving in the Prussian Army, and attaining the rank of major.

The Lippe-Biesterfeld family had lived at Oberkassel, Bonn, ever since 1770, when count Frederick William (1737–1803) had married Elisabeth Johanna, Edle von Meinertzhagen (1752–1811), who inherited a small manor house at Oberkassel where the couple moved from Biesterfeld in 1770, and which became the home to the family for the following 209 years. Beethoven is said to have been a piano teacher to the couples' children. The manor house and farm at Biesterfeld were demolished around 1820. Prince Bernhard acquired the Reckenwalde castle in eastern Brandenburg (today Wojnowo, Poland), the family's new estate, where his children grew up.

On 4 March 1909, Bernhard entered into a morganatic marriage with Baroness Armgard von Sierstorpff-Cramm, widowed Countess von Oeynhausen. Before this marriage, his wife was granted the title Countess of Biesterfeld (Gräfin von Biesterfeld) on 8 February 1909. She and her two sons Bernhard and Aschwin were created Princess (Prince) of Lippe-Biesterfeld (Prinzessin (Prinz) zur Lippe-Biesterfeld) on 24 February 1916 with the style Serene Highness, which brought their children into a more senior place in the line of succession, in which they hitherto had been the very last. The suffix Biesterfeld was revived to mark the beginning of a new cadet line.
They had two sons:
Prince Bernhard of Lippe-Biesterfeld (29 June 1911 – 1 December 2004), married in 1937 to Juliana of the Netherlands, had issue.
Prince Aschwin of Lippe-Biesterfeld (13 June 1914 – 14 May 1988), married in 1951 to Simone Arnoux, no issue.

Bernhard died in Munich, aged 61.

Ancestry

References

This article is based on this article on Dutch Wikipedia.

1872 births
1934 deaths
Bernhard
Bernhard
Prussian Army personnel
People from Bonn